Ahmad bin Ismail al-Jazyiri al-Najafi (? – 1736) was an Iranian-Iraqi Ja'fari jurist and writer, best known for his 1726 work Qalāʼid al-durar fī bayān āyāt al-aḥkām bi-al-Athār which is written about Quran-Fiqh relation by focusing on juristic verses.

Biography 
Ahmed bin Ismail bin Abd al-Nabi bin Saad al-Jaza’iri al-Gharawi/ al-Najafi was born in an unknown year in Al-Jazayir, Arabistan, under Musha’sha’iyah Emirate of Safavid Iran. Belonged to the Al-Jazairi family, who descended from  Banu Asad tribe, they came from Al-Jazayir, whose location was Lake Hammar to Al-Qurnah. This family was known in Najaf from the late 17th century, where migrated and settled. 

In Najaf, he was a student of Muhammad Salih Khatun Abadi, Ahmad ibn Muhammad Yusuf al-Bahrani, Hussein ibn Abd Ali al-Khamaisi and Abu al-Hasan al-Fotoni. He received  ijazah from some scholars of his time. Then worked as a teacher, a large group of 18th century scholars graduated from him, including: his son Muhammad, Nasrallah al-Haeri and Abdul Aziz bin Ahmed Al-Najafi. He mentioned his teachers of Islamic sciences in his  ijazah for his son. He was interested in writing and left several important works in Ja'fari jurisprudence, more famous for his book on Quran-Fiqh relation Qalāʼid al-durar fī bayān āyāt al-aḥkām bi-al-Athār() which completed in Rajab 1138/ March 1726. This book made him as one of the figures of the religious scientific revival movement in 18th century Najaf.  

Al-Jazairi died in Najaf in 1151 AH/ 1738 and was buried in the Iwan of ulema of Imam Ali Shrine.

Works 
 ,

References 

1736 deaths
Iranian Arab Islamic scholars
Iranian emigrants to Iraq
Burials at Imam Ali Mosque
Iranian religious writers
Iraqi religious writers
Iranian emigrants to the Ottoman Empire
Iranian Shia scholars of Islam
18th-century Muslim scholars of Islam
18th-century writers of Safavid Iran